The term energy input labeling involved producers of goods and services determining how much energy is used to produce their product, and then including that information on their product packaging. Energy input labeling is sometimes known by the acronym EIL. Energy input labeling provides the advantage of knowing how much energy was used to produce a product, but it does not indicate how much energy a product uses to operate, such as the European Union energy label or the Energy rating label used in Australia and New Zealand, and is not in itself a standard for energy efficiency such as Energy Saving Trust Recommended or Energy Star.

History
Energy input labeling originated as a project by several energy and economics activists to explore energy accounting.

Usage in industry
Energy input labeling is intended to be easy for producers to implement,  At minimum, they can report and label the energy used by their firm to produce products, which is called "Energy Inputs Added", some sometimes merely "Energy Added." If a firm is able to also account for all of the energy imputed by its suppliers, then a firm can report and label "Total Energy Inputs" or "Total Energy", but this is rare. Energy Input Labeling is being used and further developed by the European Organization for Sustainability.

By country

Japan
In Japan, the Top Runner Program is run in which new appliances are regularly tested on efficiency, and the most efficient ones are made the standard

See also
 European Union energy label, description of European Union energy label
 EnergyGuide, United States energy label
 Energy rating label, energy label in Australia and New Zealand
China Energy Label, the energy label used in China

References

External links
Userwww.sfsu.edu
Books.google.com.au

Energy conservation
Ecolabelling